Leonid Konstantinovich Ramzin (27 October 1887 – 28 July 1948) was a Soviet thermal engineer, and the inventor of a type of flow-through boiler known as the straight-flow boiler, or Ramzin boiler. He was a laureate of the Stalin Prize First-Class, which he received in 1943.

Life 

Leonid Konstantinovich Ramzin was born in the village of Sosnovtsy in the Tambov Governorate of the Russian Empire on 27 October 1887 (14 October O.S.). His parents, Konstantin Filipovich and Praskovya Ivanovna, were teachers at a local school.

Studies
In 1898, Ramzin entered the Tambov Men's Secondary School. He was taught mathematics by the renowned mathematician Igor Alexandrov. In 1914 he graduated from the Imperial Moscow Technical School, now known as the Bauman Moscow State Technical University, where he received a doctorate of technical sciences. He stayed at the university "for scientific activity", and became a professor there in 1920. He worked closely and was influenced by professors K. V. Kirsch and V. I. Grinevetsky, and after five years of collaboration, he was often cited along with them. For ten years, he headed the academic departments for "Fuel, furnaces and boilers" and "Thermal stations."

Gosplan
In 1921, he became a member of the Gosplan. Thanks to his professional qualities, Ramzin was recruited to work on the development and carrying-out of the GOELRO plan. He performed missions to the United States, Germany, Belgium, the United Kingdom and Czechoslovakia to gain working experience and to purchase heating and thermal-engineering equipment. He was also one of the chief organizers of the All-Russia Thermal Engineering Institute, and he served as director from 1921 to 1930, and from 1944 to his death in 1948, he was the "scientific coordinator" there.

Industrial Party Trial
In 1930, Ramzin was accused of fabricated crimes as part of the Industrial Party Trial. His witness testimony, in which he described in detail the activity of an alleged secret engineering organization, became the basis for arguments against him and the others accused in the trial. He received the death penalty sentence to be carried by shooting, which was substituted with ten years of imprisonment.

Work in the "Sharashkas"
While incarcerated, he continued his work on the construction of his flow-through boiler design. In 1933, the first Ramzin boiler was put to use by the "TETs-9" enterprise under Mosenergo.
In 1934, Ramzin was made head of the OKB ("Experimental Design Bureau") which headed the construction of Ramzin boilers, organized as part of the ninth State Political Directorate administrative group. This bureau, in which the arrested engineers worked, became one of the first so-called "Sharashka's".

Release 
In 1936, Leonid Ramzin was granted amnesty and released from prison.

In 1943, he, along with academic Andrei Sheglyayev, founded the power-machine building faculty and the academic department for boiler building in the Moscow Power Engineering Institute. Since 1944, Ramzin himself headed the boiler building academic department at the MPEI.

Leonid Ramzin died in 1948. He was buried at the Armenian Cemetery in Moscow.

Works
Rational Direction of the USSR Fuel Economy. Moscow, 1930.
Thermal Power Stations. Moscow, 1930.
Soviet Straight-Flow Boiler Construction In the collection "Ramzin's Straight-Flow Boilers". Moscow-Leningrad, 1948.

Awards and prizes 
 USSR State Prize first class (1943) — for the creation of the design of the Ramzin boiler.
 Order of Lenin
 Order of the Red Banner of Labour

References

External links 
 Леонид Константинович Рамзин (Russian)

Soviet engineers
Soviet inventors
Recipients of the Order of Lenin
1887 births
1948 deaths
Sharashka inmates
Stalin Prize winners
People from Tambov Governorate
Academic staff of Moscow Power Engineering Institute
Bauman Moscow State Technical University alumni